The banded prinia (Prinia bairdii) is a species of bird in the family Cisticolidae.

It is found in Angola, Burundi, Cameroon, Central African Republic, Republic of the Congo, Democratic Republic of the Congo, Equatorial Guinea, Gabon, Kenya, Nigeria, Rwanda, and Uganda. Its natural habitats are subtropical or tropical moist lowland forest and subtropical or tropical moist montane forest.

The eastern races are sometimes regarded as a separate species, the black-faced prinia (P. melanops).

References

banded prinia
Birds of Sub-Saharan Africa
Birds of Central Africa
banded prinia
Taxonomy articles created by Polbot